The crash of Japan Air Lines Flight 301 was an accident involving a Martin 2-0-2 of the Japanese airline Japan Airlines on Mount Mihara, Izu Ōshima, Japan on 9 April 1952, killing all 37 people on board.

Accident 
Japan Air Lines Flight 301 took off from Tokyo-Haneda Airport in Tokyo, Japan in the morning of 9 April 1952 on a scheduled flight to Fukuoka Airport in Fukuoka, Japan with a stopover in Osaka, Japan, carrying 4 crew and 33 passengers. While flight 301 was cruising approx. 62 miles (100 km) South of Tokyo in marginal weather conditions, the aircraft crashed into the slope of Mount Mihara on Izu Ōshima at 8.07 am. The plane's wreckage was discovered several hours after the crash, which revealed that none of the 37 people on board the flight survived the crash.

Aircraft 

The Martin 2-0-2 involved, registered N93043 (msn 9164) and named Mokusei (Jupiter), was built in 1947 and was used by Japan Airlines during its final flight after having been leased from Northwest Airlines.

Aftermath 
The aircraft was destroyed in the accident, while all 37 occupants of the flight were killed. An investigation of the accident by the Japanese government aircraft accident investigation committee was hampered by the occupation authorities due to their refusal to provide a tape recording of the conversations between the ATC at Haneda Airport and Flight 301. Alongside the fact that flight 301 was not equipped with either a CVR or a FDR, the exact cause of the crash could not be determined. The committee proposed that the only evidence they had, which was that the aircraft had deviated from its original course, suggested that the cause of the accident was due to a navigational error by the pilots of flight 301.

References

External links 

Japan Airlines accidents and incidents
Airliner accidents and incidents with an unknown cause
Airliner accidents and incidents involving controlled flight into terrain
1952 in Japan
Aviation accidents and incidents in 1952
Accidents and incidents involving the Martin 2-0-2
Aviation accidents and incidents in Japan
April 1952 events
April 1952 events in Asia